This is a list of Ukrainian football transfers winter 2018–19. Only clubs in 2018–19 Ukrainian Premier League and 2018–19 Ukrainian First League are included.

Ukrainian Premier League

Arsenal Kyiv

In:

Out:

Chornomorets Odesa

In:

Out:

Desna Chernihiv

In:

Out:

Dynamo Kyiv

In:

Out:

Karpaty Lviv

In:

Out:

Lviv

In:

Out:

Mariupol

In:

Out:

Oleksandriya

In:

Out:

Olimpik Donetsk

In:

Out:

Shakhtar Donetsk

In:

Out:

Vorskla Poltava

In:

Out:

Zorya Luhansk

In:

Out:

Ukrainian First League

Ahrobiznes Volochysk

In:

 
Out:

Avanhard Kramatorsk

In:

Out:

Balkany Zorya

In:

Out:

Dnipro-1

In:

Out:

Hirnyk-Sport Horishni Plavni

In:

Out:

Inhulets Petrove

In:

Out:

Kolos Kovalivka

In:

Out:

Metalist 1925 Kharkiv

In:

Out:

Mykolaiv

In:

Out:

Obolon-Brovar Kyiv

In:

Out:

Prykarpattia Ivano-Frankivsk

In:

Out:

Rukh Vynnyky

In:

Out:

Sumy

In:

Out:

Volyn Lutsk

In:

Out:

Zirka Kropyvnytskyi

In:

Out:

References

Ukraine
Transfers
2018-9